Lee Page (born 6 November 1987) is an English former professional snooker player from Kidderminster. He began his professional career by playing Challenge Tour in 2004, at the time the second-level professional tour.

Career
Page first entered Main Tour for the 2006–07 season, but was unable to retain his place for the following season's tour. He qualified for the 2009–10 season, however he was relegated from the circuit at the end of the season. He returned to the tour in 2013 after winning a two-year card in Q School for the 2013–14 and 2014–15 seasons.

Performance and rankings timeline

Career finals

Pro-am finals: 1

Amateur finals: 2

References

External links
 
 Player profile on World Snooker
 Player profile on Pro Snooker Blog
 Player profile on Global Snooker

1987 births
Living people
English snooker players
Sportspeople from Redditch
Sportspeople from Kidderminster